The ,  also known as  or 
(all meaning "three strings"), is a three-stringed traditional Japanese musical instrument derived from the Chinese instrument . It is played with a plectrum called a bachi.

The Japanese pronunciation is usually  but sometimes  when used as a suffix, according to regular sound change (e.g. ).

The construction of the  varies in shape, depending on the genre in which it is used. The instrument used to accompany kabuki has a thin neck, facilitating the agile and virtuosic requirements of that genre. The one used to accompany puppet plays and folk songs has a longer and thicker neck instead, to match the more robust music of those genres.

Construction

The  is a plucked stringed instrument. Its construction follows a model similar to that of a guitar or a banjo, with a neck and strings stretched across a resonating body. The skin used depends on the genre of music and the skill of the player. Traditionally, skins were made using dog or cat skin, with cat skin favored for finer instruments; though use of animal skins was common throughout the 20th century, use of these skins gradually fell out of favor, starting around the mid 2000s, due to social stigma and the decline of workers skilled in preparing these particular skins. Contemporary  skins are often prepared with synthetic materials, such as plastic.

The pegs used to wind the strings are long, thin and hexagonal in shape; though they were traditionally fashioned out of ivory, due to scarcity and trading regulations regarding and constricting the sale of ivory, many are now constructed from other materials, such as wood and plastic.

The three strings of the shamisen are made of either silk (traditionally) or nylon. They are stretched between the pegs at the head of the instrument, and a cloth tailpiece anchored at the end of the rod which protrudes on the other side of the body. The head of the instrument known as a  may also be protected by a cover. The material of the strings will depend on the skill of the player. Traditionally, silk strings are used. However, silk breaks easily over a short time, so this is reserved for professional performances. Students often use nylon or 'tetron' strings, which last longer than silk, and are also less expensive.

Variations in construction and playing method

The construction of the  varies in shape and size, depending on the genre in which it is used. The  used will also be different according to genre, if it is used at all.  are classified according to size and genre.

Purists of these genres demand that the  be made of the correct wood, the correct skin, and are played with the correct , with little room for variation. The , on the other hand, has lent itself to modern use, and is used in modern genres such as jazz and rock. As a more open instrument, variations of it exist for show.

The body is small and particularly square-shaped, with a particularly thin neck, which tapers away from the strings just as it approaches the body.

As its name implies, the neck is slightly thicker. The fingerboard ends abruptly, and the rest of the neck curves sharply into the body of the instrument. The pronounced curve that occurs just before the neck meets the body is called . The  is favored for -style playing, with a broader, more mellow timbre. It is also an "all-round" instrument that can be used across many genres.

In these genres, a thicker neck facilitates the greater force used in playing the music of these styles.

The  is a  particularly fashioned for the performance of the song , a folk tune originating from Shimonoseki, Yamaguchi Prefecture. The use of more typical  is possible, but they must be properly adjusted with a capo device to raise their pitch to make them suitable for use. Today the strings are made out of steel to make a better sound and the drum heads are made out of plastic to avoid breakage in a performance.

Variations in 

The  used for  can be made out of three possible materials: wood, plastic, or ivory. While many  teachers generally do not approve of the use of plastic, if ivory is unattainable and wood is still out of price range, plastic is considered acceptable for use.

 are made entirely out of plastic or ivory, plastic and tortoiseshell, or ivory and tortoiseshell.  are the easiest to identify as they are the longest, the widest, and also have a deep indentation where the tortoiseshell meets the handle. There are sometimes also  that are made with a buffalo horn handle. The material, however, makes no difference in the sound.

Other structural variations
The , or bridge, can be fashioned out of aged bamboo, ivory, ox-bone, rosewood, buffalo horn,  wood, any combination of the above, or plastic for the student level.  come in many heights. Higher  are not considered suitable for beginners.

Ivory is the most expensive and produces the most desirable sound and amplification, but due to its high price tag is normally only used in performances.

Blackwater buffalo horn does not have a significant sound difference when cut in the  style, and is far less popular. Yellow  is the most widely used for -style , both in practice and performance.

The base is usually made of either bamboo, smoked bamboo, or a wood of some kind, while the top half in which the strings pass through can be made of ivory, bone, or tortoiseshell.

Variations in playing

Tuning

The  is played and tuned according to genre, with the nomenclature of the nodes in an octave also varies according to genre. A number of  styles exist across Japan, and tunings, tonality and notation vary to some degree.

means "home tuning" or "base tuning," and is called so because other tunings are considered to derive from it. For , the first and third strings are tuned an octave apart, while the middle string is tuned to the equivalent of a fourth, in Western terms, from the 1st string.

means "raised two" or "raised second", referring to the fact that the pitch of the second string is raised (from ), increasing the interval of the first and second strings to a fifth (conversely decreasing the interval between the second and third strings to a fourth).

C-F-B♭.

Instead of having a set tuning, such as on a guitar (i.e. E, A, D, G, B, E) or a violin (i.e.

Musical notation

Music for the  can be written in Western music notation, but is more often written in tablature notation. While tunings might be similar across genres, the way in which the nodes on the neck of the instrument (called  in Japanese) are named is not. As a consequence, tablature for each genre is written differently. However, in the  style, nodes are subdivided and named by octave, with "1" being the open string and first note in an octave, starting over at the next octave. The nodes are also labeled differently for -style . To add to the confusion, sometimes nodes can be "sharped," and since the names of nodes and their positions are different for each genre, these will also vary.

Tablature can be written in traditional Japanese vertical right-to-left notation, or it can be written in more modern horizontal left-to-right notation, which resembles modern guitar tablature. In traditional vertical notation, Chinese characters and older symbols for dynamics are used, however notation from Western style music notation, such as Italian names for dynamics, time signature and the fermata have been imported. What tuning a work calls for is usually indicated on the tablature.

History and genres
The Japanese  originated from the Chinese . The  was introduced through the Ryūkyū Kingdom (Okinawa) in the 16th century, where it developed into the Okinawan , from which the  ultimately derives.

The  and its plectrum are the largest of the  family, and the singer-narrator is required to speak the roles of the play, as well as to sing all the commentaries on the action. The singer-narrator role is often so vocally taxing that the performers are changed halfway through a scene. There is little notated in the books of the tradition except the words and the names of certain appropriate generic  responses. The  player must know the entire work perfectly in order to respond effectively to the interpretations of the text by the singer-narrator.

In the early part of the 20th century, blind musicians, including Shirakawa Gunpachirō (1909–1962), Takahashi Chikuzan (1910–1998), and sighted players such as Kida Rinshōei (1911–1979), evolved a new style of playing, based on traditional folk songs but involving much improvisation and flashy fingerwork. The virtuosic  style is sometimes compared to bluegrass banjo.

 is a more classical style of  music.

in non-traditional genres 

 Takeshi Terauchi & Bunnys utilized  played by Michiya Mihashi in combo with their instrumental rock group on their single  with "Dark Eyes".
 American  player and guitarist Kevin Kmetz leads a rock band called God of Shamisen, which is based in Santa Cruz, California, and also plays the instrument with the band Estradasphere.
 Japanese traditional and jazz musician Hiromitsu Agatsuma incorporates a diverse mix of genres into his music. He arranged several jazz standards and other famous western songs for the shamisen on his album Agatsuma Plays Standards in 2008. His previous recordings, such as Beyond from 2004, displayed traditional Japanese styles mixed with funk, techno and rock.
 Noriko Tadano is a  player born and raised in Japan, who now resides in Australia. She has collaborated with a wide variety of musicians from genres such as blues, jazz, folk, experimental and electronic music. Tadano has performed in collaborations at a number of world festivals. Tadano performed in the blues duo 'George & Noriko' on season 6 of Australia's Got Talent, making it to the finals.

See also

References

Bibliography

External links

Book on Shamisen
About Shamisen
Jishin Shamidaiko (Brazil)
God of Shamisen is a progressive/metal band that has implemented the acoustic and amplified sound of the tsugaru-jamisen
Nitaboh Official Site (feature movie about the disputed origin of the Tsuragu-jamisen style)
Kouta 
Nagauta
Hauta – Utazawa – Kouta
S.K.I.N.'s World Debut – S.K.I.N. debut concert live report at JAME

Audio
Listen to a shamisen (in modern times)

 
Japanese musical instruments
Drumhead lutes
Spike lutes
Continuous pitch instruments
String instruments
Japanese words and phrases